Al-Kalaʾbah is a sub-district located in the Al-Ma'afer District, Taiz Governorate, Yemen. Al-Kalaʾbah had a population of 12,619 according to the 2004 census.

References  

Sub-districts in Al-Ma'afer District